AdamWorks, LLC (AdamWorks), is an American engineering and manufacturing organization specializing in designing, tooling and manufacturing of composite structures and mechanical systems.

History 

The company was founded in 2007 to pursue composites engineering/manufacturing projects in government, defense, space, commercial, and alternative energy markets.

Since its inception, AdamWorks has designed and built a variety of spacecraft pressure vessels, aerospace and aircraft structures, radomes, pods and pod systems, unmanned aerial vehicle structures, with a portfolio of products flying on over 17 different military and civilian aircraft.

Services 

 Engineering
 Tooling
 Design and Manufacture
 Build to print structures
 Reverse engineering
 Rapid prototyping
 Static Testing
 Production engineering
 Production manufacturing

Projects 

 UAV Sensor Pod Design and Fabrication to support Wide Area Airborne Sensor (WAAS) Integration, including full Environmental Control System (ECS) integration
 Tooling Design, Fabrication, Parts Design and Fabrication for Primary Structure for a suborbital spacecraft funded under NASA's Commercial Orbital Transportation Services (COTS) and Commercial Crew Development (CCDev) Initiative 
 Design, tooling, and manufacture of a Multi-Sensor Fairing Assembly housing a multi-spectral sensor integrated onto a Boeing 700-series test bed aircraft
 Radomes, Composite Pallets, Operator Workstations, and Airborne Server rack integration supporting conversion of a cargo aircraft into an ISR platform 
 Fabrication of sub-orbital space vehicle pressure vessel for the Space Tourism Industry
DARPA-funded man-portable wind-generator power project
 Structural engineering services for composite compound coaxial Joint Multi-Role demonstrator helicopter designed by prime contractor (AVX Aircraft Company) for the US Army's Future Vertical Lift initiative

Milestones 

 AdamWorks receives its ISO 9001:2008 certification in 2011.
 Facility Expansion (2011)
 Delivery of Dream Chaser flight test vehicle (12/11/2011)
 AdamWorks is a Finalist for Colorado Companies To Watch (April, 2013)

References

External links
 AdamWorks, LLC official website

Engineering companies of the United States
Aerospace companies of the United States
Companies based in Centennial, Colorado
Technology companies established in 2007
2007 establishments in Colorado